Libby Jones is a Novocastrian musician who currently teaches music.  Her primary instrument is drums and percussion, though she also plays guitar, harmonica and on occasion, the ukulele.

Hit Like A Girl Australian Ambassador 2015 

Libby was chosen as the 2015 Hit Like A Girl international ambassador for Australia. Her role as ambassador involves promoting female drumming (and the competition) nationally.

Hit Like A Girl 2014 

Libby represented Australia, competing in the Hit Like A Girl 2014 international female drumming competition with her drum cover of Rush's YYZ.

Libby received support from the LGBT community and was featured in an article for Australian Lesbian Magazine Lesbians on the Loose.

The Newcastle Herald featured an article on Libby helping to promote International Women's Day, quoting Libby ‘‘I know when I was starting out, I was the only one I knew playing drums at all,’’ says Jones, who’s played since the age of 12. ‘‘It hasn’t really changed; we’re still outnumbered 99 to one.’’

Band History 
1995–2002 – Twin Psyche (Drums)

1999–2001 – Heddy's Revenge (Drums) 

2002–2007 – Old Sound Central (Drums) 

2007–2009 – Girl in the Picture (Guitar & Harmonica) 

2009–2010 – Vamp (Drums) 

2010–2011 – MixTape Memoirs (Guitar, Harmonica, Percussion & Vocals) 

2011–2013 – The May Fields (Guitar, Harmonica, Percussion & Vocals)

2014-2015 - Gen-X (Percussion) 

2018 - Now - Pretty Irresistible (Percussion)

Personal 

Libby Jones was born on 18 January in Port Macquarie, NSW, Australia.

She obtained a Bachelor of Visual Communications from Newcastle University, a Bachelor of Music from University of New England and an Advanced Diploma in Music Industry (Music Business) from TAFE.

She currently lives in the Hunter Valley, NSW, with her wife, their two cats, one cattle dog and nine chickens.

References 

1979 births
Living people
Australian drummers
Women drummers
People from Newcastle, New South Wales
21st-century women musicians
21st-century drummers